Smithborough railway station was on the Ulster Railway in the Republic of Ireland.

The Ulster Railway opened the station on 2 March 1863.

It closed on 14 October 1957.

Routes

References

Disused railway stations in County Monaghan
Railway stations opened in 1863
Railway stations closed in 1957